The station complex of Amtrak's Oakland Coliseum station and Bay Area Rapid Transit (BART)'s Coliseum station is located in the East Oakland area of Oakland, California, United States.

The BART station opened in 1972, serving the then-new Oakland Coliseum and the surrounding neighborhood. The Amtrak platform was added in 2005, making it one of two transfer points between BART and Amtrak's Capitol Corridor service. In 2014, the complex became the terminus of the Coliseum–Oakland International Airport line, providing a rail connection to Oakland International Airport. The station also serves as a transfer point for AC Transit buses and business park shuttles.

History

Coliseum station opened as part of the first segment of the BART system on September 11, 1972. It was soon connected to its namesake, the Oakland–Alameda County Coliseum/Oakland–Alameda County Coliseum Arena sports complex, by a  pedestrian bridge over San Leandro Street and the Union Pacific Railroad's right-of-way located adjacent to the sports complex. The bridge initially opened for a brief period in October 1974 for the American League playoffs and the 1974 World Series; it closed on October 18 due to excessive swaying, but reopened in 1975. AirBART bus service to Oakland International Airport began on July 1, 1977, and the station was renamed Coliseum/Oakland Airport to reflect the new connection to the airport.

Amtrak's long-distance Coast Starlight service has used the Union Pacific right-of-way since its inception in 1971, but served only the main downtown stops in Oakland at 16th Street station, then Jack London Square station when it replaced the former. Capitol Corridor service began in 1991, but did not initially stop at the Oakland Coliseum site. In 2002, the Capitol Corridor Joint Powers Authority (CCJPA), in conjunction with Caltrans and the City of Oakland, decided to build a Capitol Corridor station at Oakland Coliseum. The new $6.6 million Oakland Coliseum station opened on June 6, 2005; it included a newly built accessible connection to the original BART-Oakland–Alameda County Coliseum pedestrian bridge, facilitating a grade separated transfer between the Capitol Corridor and BART.

BART considered plans for a rail link to Oakland International Airport as early as 1970, including a bi-directional loop off the main line, but no sigificant progress was made until the early 1990s.  In 2009, the Oakland City Council approved the construction of the Oakland Airport Connector, a  automated guideway transit line. Construction on the line began in October 2010; it was renamed the Coliseum-Oakland International Airport line by BART. The line's Coliseum station opened on November 21, 2014, along with the rest of the line. AirBART bus service between the station and the airport was discontinued. The name of the conventional BART station was changed back to Coliseum, allowing the terminus station at the airport to be named as Oakland International Airport station.

In the early 2000s, planning began for transit-oriented development to replace a station parking lot. The Coliseum Connections project, a modular structure with 110 mixed-income units on a  site, was constructed from November 2017 to April 4, 2019. The developers of the project lease the site from BART. In August 2020, a mural by seven Oakland Unified School District students was completed in the pedestrian tunnel.

Station layout

Amtrak station
The Amtrak station is an unstaffed grade-level station located at the western end of the 73rd Avenue cul-de-sac. The station has few amenities other than benches sheltered by open-air canopies. An QuikTrak ticket machine that was previously located at the station was removed due to vandalism issues. The Union Pacific Railroad (UP) Niles Subdivision has three tracks at the station — two mainline tracks used by Union Pacific freight trains (and the Coast Starlight), and a siding track with a single side platform serving Capitol Corridor trains. Oakland Coliseum is primarily served by through trains between Sacramento and San Jose, but also functions as a part-time terminal for some Capitol Corridor service traveling to/from Sacramento. An accessible ramp structure connects the platform to the pedestrian bridge.

BART station

The BART station is an elevated three-level structure. Fare control and concessions are located on the ground level, east of San Leandro Street, underneath the northern end of the platform. Conventional BART trains serve an island platform on the elevated second level. The grade-level UP Oakland Subdivision runs parallel to BART on the east side of the station, separating it from the adjacent Coliseum neighborhood. An accessible pedestrian underpass tunnel with a stairlift runs underneath the Union Pacific right-of-way and connects the fare control area with the parking area and Snell Street. A taxi stand is located along the western side of San Leandro Street just north of 71st Avenue, with a secondary taxi loading zone also located along the eastern side of Snell Street near the bicycle locker area.

Oakland Airport Connector 

The Beige Line station is located on the third level of the Oakland Coliseum station complex. It has one track serving one side platform. It has no direct non-emergency street access and can only be reached from the main BART platform. Unlike conventional BART stations, platform screen doors provide a barrier between the platform and the guideway of the driverless system. The fare for the line is charged at Coliseum station for travel in both directions.

The walls of the platform area feature an artwork titled A-Round Oakland by Gordon Huether.

Bus service

Coliseum station is one of the main bus-rail interchanges for East Oakland (along with Fruitvale station) and is served 24/7 by various bus services. It is served by eight AC Transit bus routes, which stop on both sides of San Leandro Street:

Local routes 45, 73, 90, and 98
All Nighter route 805
Limited-stop route 46L
School routes 646 and 657

In addition, several fare-free local shuttle routes stop at the BART passenger loading zone on the southeastern corner of San Leandro Street and 71st Avenue. These include the Alameda County East Oakland Shuttle, which connects the station with county offices at Eastmont Town Center, Edgewater Drive, and Enterprise Way, as well as shuttle buses serving the nearby Harbor Bay Business Park.

References

External links

BART: Coliseum
Capitol Corridor: Oakland Coliseum (OAC)

Bay Area Rapid Transit stations in Alameda County, California
Stations on the Orange Line (BART)
Stations on the Green Line (BART)
Stations on the Blue Line (BART)
Stations on the Beige Line (BART)
Amtrak stations in Alameda County, California
Railway stations in Oakland, California
Bus stations in Alameda County, California
Railway stations in the United States opened in 1972
Railway stations in the United States opened in 2005
Railway stations in the United States opened in 2014
Transit centers in the United States
1972 establishments in California